Philokalist or Philocalist literally means "lover of beauty"   (Greek roots phil- + kalos). The term may refer to:

A pen name of Felix Wierzbicki
An author or a follower of Philokalia, a guidance for  Eastern Orthodox monks
An author of any book titled Philocalia, e.g., Origen